The Ngatau River is a river of the West Coast and Otago regions of New Zealand's South Island. The river's entire length is within Mount Aspiring National Park.

See also
List of rivers of New Zealand

References

Rivers of Otago
Rivers of the West Coast, New Zealand
Westland District
Mount Aspiring National Park
Rivers of New Zealand